Finland competed at the 2015 World Aquatics Championships in Kazan, Russia from 24 July to 9 August 2015.

Diving

Finnish divers qualified for the individual spots and the synchronized teams at the World Championships.

Men

Women

Swimming

Finnish swimmers have achieved qualifying standards in the following events (up to a maximum of 2 swimmers in each event at the A-standard entry time, and 1 at the B-standard): Swimmers must qualify at the 2015 Finnish Grand Prix series (for pool events) to confirm their places for the Worlds.

Twelve Finnish swimmers (four men and eight women) have been selected to the nation's official roster at the World Championships, including four-time Olympian Hanna-Maria Seppälä and 2013 World bronze medalist Matti Mattsson.

Men

Women

Mixed

References

External links
Suomen Uimaliitto 

Nations at the 2015 World Aquatics Championships
2015 in Finnish sport
Finland at the World Aquatics Championships